Osterland (terra orientalis) is a historical region in Germany. It was situated between the Elbe and Saale rivers to the north of Pleissnerland which it later absorbed and it included the city of Leipzig. The name derives from the previous name of the territory, Ostmark, meaning "eastern march."

Today, the area belongs to the German states of Thuringia and Saxony.

See also 
 List of regions of Saxony

External links 
Map of the Wettinc Lands with Osterland

Historical regions in Germany
Geography of Saxony
Regions of Thuringia
History of the Holy Roman Empire by location